Reliance Anil Dhirubhai Ambani Group or popularly known as Reliance ADA Group or simply Reliance Group is an Indian conglomerate, headquartered in Mumbai, India. The company, which was formed after Dhirubhai Ambani's business was divided up, is headed by his younger son Anil Ambani. 
Reliance Group has five listed companies, Reliance Power, Reliance Infrastructure, Reliance Capital, Reliance Home Finance and Reliance Health. The group provides financial services, construction, entertainment, power, health care, manufacturing, defence, aviation, and transportation services.

History

Reliance Commercial Corporation was founded by Dhirubhai Ambani in 1966 as a polyester firm. It was renamed to Reliance Industries on 8 May 1973. Reliance later entered into financial services, petroleum refining, power sector. By 2002 Reliance had grown into a U$15 billion conglomerate. After the death of Dhirubhai Ambani on 6 July 2002, Reliance was headed by his two sons. The Reliance ADA Group was formed in 2006 after the two brothers Mukesh Ambani and Anil Ambani, split Reliance Industries in December 2005. Anil Ambani got the responsibility of Reliance Infocomm, Reliance Energy and Reliance Capital. Reliance Group entered the power sector through Reliance Power, and the entertainment sector by acquiring Adlabs. In October 2010, Reliance power placed world's largest order worth $8.29 billion to Shanghai Electric Group to supply power equipment based on Supercritical steam generator technology. On 28 October 2017, the group launched construction of a defense production unit in Mihan-SEZ region. The unit will be part of a joint venture between Reliance Group, led by Anil Ambani, and its JV partner French major Dassault Aviation. The production at Mihan-SEZ will begin with components for the Rafale warplanes and Falcon business jet produced by Dassault. It is expected to fully assemble both the aircraft in the Nagpur unit in the coming years.

Major acquisitions

See also
 List of companies of India
 List of largest companies by revenue
 List of public corporations by market capitalization
 Make in India

References

External links 
 

 01
Conglomerate companies of India
Companies based in Mumbai
Gas turbine manufacturers
Aircraft engine manufacturers of India
Aerospace companies of India
Conglomerate companies established in 1966
Indian companies established in 1966
1966 establishments in Maharashtra